is a stratovolcano in Fukushima Prefecture, Japan.

It is located about 15 kilometres southwest of the city of Fukushima and east of Mount Bandai. Its last known eruption was in 1996. An eruption in 1900 killed 72 workers at a sulfur mine located in the summit crater.

History 
The mountain is actually multiple volcanoes forming a broad, forested massif. It abuts Mount Azuma, a dormant volcano to the north. The peak is called Minowa-yama. It is the highest peak in the Adatara range, which stretches about 9 km in a north-south direction.

The active summit crater is surrounded by hot springs and fumaroles. Sulfur mining was carried out in the 19th century, and 72 mine workers were killed in an eruption in 1900. Poems about Mount Adatara by Kōtarō Takamura from his book "Chieko-sho" helped make it famous.

Gallery

See also
 List of volcanoes in Japan
 List of mountains in Japan

References

Sources

See also 
 Mount Bandai
 Mount Iide

External links 

 Adatarayama - Japan Meteorological Agency 
 　Adatarayama: National catalogue of the active volcanoes in Japan - Japan Meteorological Agency
 Adatara Yama - Geological Survey of Japan
 Adatarayama: Global Volcanism Program - Smithsonian Institution

Mountains of Fukushima Prefecture
Volcanoes of Fukushima Prefecture
Volcanoes of Honshū
Stratovolcanoes of Japan
Active volcanoes
Pleistocene stratovolcanoes
Holocene stratovolcanoes